Sir Robert Furse McMillan  (24 January 1858 – 23 April 1931) was a Chief Justice of the Supreme Court of Western Australia, which is the highest ranking court in the Australian State of Western Australia.

McMillan was born in Camden Town, London, England and educated at Westminster School. He was called to the bar in 1881 and in 1902 he was appointed as a judge of the Supreme Court and arrived in Western Australia in 1903.

See also
 Judiciary of Australia

References
Eric J. Edwards, 'McMillan, Sir Robert Furse (1858 - 1931)', Australian Dictionary of Biography, Volume 10, MUP, 1986, pp 341–342.
Additional resources listed by the Australian Dictionary of Biography:
University of Western Australia Law Review, 6, no 2, December 1963
Brighton Times (England), 24 September 1880, supplement
West Australian, 1 December 1902, 24 & 25 April 1931
The Times (London), 24 April 1931

1858 births
1931 deaths
Australian Knights Commander of the Order of St Michael and St George
Australian Knights Bachelor
Chief Justices of Western Australia
Judges of the Supreme Court of Western Australia
People from Camden Town
English emigrants to Australia